Below is a list of TV companies in Latin America, followed by the network's slogan.

Argentina
Telefe - Siempre Juntos
Artear - Prendete al Trece
Ideas del Sur
Pol-Ka

Brazil
Rede Globo - A gente se liga em você
Rede Record - Se tem Brasil, tem Record no ar
SBT - #Compartilhe
Rede Bandeirantes - Tá todo mundo aqui
RedeTV! - A rede de TV que mais cresce no Brasil!

Bolivia
Bolivia TV - el Canal del Estado Plurinacional de Bolivia
Red ATB - La red que más se ve
Bolivisión - Somos parte de tí
Red Unitel - Unidos por la tele
Red Uno - La alegría es naranja
Red PAT - Crecemos juntos

Chile
TVN - El Canal de Chile
Canal 13 - Por el 13, El Canal de los Realities
MEGA - Mi Mega
CHV - Te Ve De Verdad
La RED - na' que ver

Colombia
Caracol TV - Mas Cerca de Ti 
RCN TV - Nuestra Tele
RTI Producciones
Señal Colombia
Señal Institucional
Canal Uno

Regional and Local Station
Canal Capital
Citytv
Telepacifico
Telecaribe
Televisión Regional del Oriente
Canal 13
CMB Televisión
Teleantioquia
Telecafe
Teleislas
Cine+
Canal Congreso

International
Caracol TV Internacional
RCN Nuestra Tele

Costa Rica
Teletica - Siempre Con Usted 
Repretel - Somos Como Vos

Mexico
Televisa
Las Estrellas - El Canal de las Estrellas nuestro canal
Canal 5 - #PorqueSí'
Gala TV - Más de lo que sientesFOROtv - Tú tienes la palabraTV Azteca
Azteca 7 - Te damos de qué hablarAzteca Uno - Todos somos unoadn40 - Activa tu menteGrupo Imagen
Imagen Televisión - Juntos Somos LibresGrupo Multimedios
Multimedios Television - El Canal Que Todos VemosMilenio Television - Milenio Television Paraguay  

 Teledeportes 
 Gala Producciones
 Telefuturo

 Uruguay 

 SAETA TV Canal 10
 Tenfield 
 Sports Field S.A.

Venezuela
RCTV - Marca el PasoVenevisión - Como túTeleven - Tu Canal''

References
http://www.televisa.com/
http://redeglobo.globo.com/
http://multimedios.tv/

Latin American culture
Latin American media
Latin America-related lists
Lists of companies by industry
Broadcasting companies